Sean Wellman (born 20 September 1974) is a former Australian rules footballer who played for the Adelaide Football Club and Essendon Football Club in the Australian Football League (AFL).

Wellman was a key position player who arrived at the AFL's Adelaide Football Club from North Adelaide. He played 34 games across his first two seasons in 1994 and 1995, before moving to Essendon in 1996. He became a key defender for the club and was often called "Not a well man" as a play on his surname by commentator Rex Hunt.

He played 212 games and kicked  34 goals, playing mainly as a center-half-back. He was a member of Essendon's premiership side in 2000, he played in every game of the season, and was a member of their losing grand final team in 2001. He received All-Australian selection in 1998 and 2001 and International rules representation in 1998. He retired from the AFL at the end of 2004. Since his retirement he has spent time at Melbourne and at the Western Bulldogs as an assistant coach.  He has returned to Essendon as an Assistant coach for the 2011 season.

Statistics

|- style="background-color: #EAEAEA"
! scope="row" style="text-align:center" | 1994
|style="text-align:center;"|
| 44 || 17 || 5 || 3 || 114 || 75 || 189 || 50 || 17 || 0.3 || 0.2 || 6.7 || 4.4 || 11.1 || 2.9 || 1.0
|-
! scope="row" style="text-align:center" | 1995
|style="text-align:center;"|
| 44 || 17 || 4 || 3 || 122 || 54 || 176 || 45 || 10 || 0.2 || 0.2 || 7.2 || 3.2 || 10.4 || 2.6 || 0.6
|- style="background:#eaeaea;"
! scope="row" style="text-align:center" | 1996
|style="text-align:center;"|
| 6 || 9 || 0 || 0 || 59 || 37 || 96 || 28 || 4 || 0.0 || 0.0 || 6.6 || 4.1 || 10.7 || 3.1 || 0.4
|-
! scope="row" style="text-align:center" | 1997
|style="text-align:center;"|
| 6 || 22 || 2 || 2 || 208 || 81 || 289 || 100 || 17 || 0.1 || 0.1 || 9.5 || 3.7 || 13.1 || 4.5 || 0.8
|- style="background:#eaeaea;"
! scope="row" style="text-align:center" | 1998
|style="text-align:center;"|
| 6 || 23 || 2 || 3 || 248 || 111 || 359 || 122 || 15 || 0.1 || 0.1 || 10.8 || 4.8 || 15.6 || 5.3 || 0.7
|-
! scope="row" style="text-align:center" | 1999
|style="text-align:center;"|
| 6 || 22 || 1 || 0 || 259 || 90 || 349 || 94 || 15 || 0.0 || 0.0 || 11.8 || 4.1 || 15.9 || 4.3 || 0.7
|- style="background:#eaeaea;"
! scope="row" style="text-align:center" | 2000
|style="text-align:center;"|
| 6 || 25 || 5 || 1 || 231 || 127 || 358 || 100 || 25 || 0.2 || 0.0 || 9.2 || 5.1 || 14.3 || 4.0 || 1.0
|-
! scope="row" style="text-align:center" | 2001
|style="text-align:center;"|
| 6 || 23 || 10 || 4 || 266 || 122 || 388 || 125 || 33 || 0.4 || 0.2 || 11.6 || 5.3 || 16.9 || 5.4 || 1.4
|- style="background:#eaeaea;"
! scope="row" style="text-align:center" | 2002
|style="text-align:center;"|
| 6 || 22 || 3 || 4 || 243 || 99 || 342 || 128 || 29 || 0.1 || 0.2 || 11.0 || 4.5 || 15.5 || 5.8 || 1.3
|-
! scope="row" style="text-align:center" | 2003
|style="text-align:center;"|
| 6 || 20 || 2 || 3 || 201 || 106 || 307 || 89 || 31 || 0.1 || 0.2 || 10.1 || 5.3 || 15.4 || 4.5 || 1.6
|- style="background:#eaeaea;"
! scope="row" style="text-align:center" | 2004
|style="text-align:center;"|
| 6 || 12 || 0 || 0 || 100 || 46 || 146 || 63 || 17 || 0.0 || 0.0 || 8.3 || 3.8 || 12.2 || 5.3 || 1.4
|- class="sortbottom"
! colspan=3| Career
! 212
! 34
! 23
! 2051
! 948
! 2999
! 944
! 213
! 0.2
! 0.1
! 9.7
! 4.5
! 14.1
! 4.5
! 1.0
|}

References

North Adelaide Football Club players
All-Australians (AFL)
Adelaide Football Club players
Essendon Football Club players
Essendon Football Club Premiership players
South Australian State of Origin players
1974 births
Living people
Australia international rules football team players
One-time VFL/AFL Premiership players
Australian rules footballers from Adelaide